Jaroslav Müller (born 1901, date of death unknown) was a Czech swimmer. He competed in the men's 200 metre breaststroke event at the 1924 Summer Olympics.

References

External links
 

1901 births
Year of death missing
Czech male swimmers
Olympic swimmers of Czechoslovakia
Swimmers at the 1924 Summer Olympics
Place of birth missing
Male breaststroke swimmers